× Sophrolaelia (from Sophronitis and Laelia, its parent genera) is an intergeneric hybrid of orchids. It is abbreviated Sl. in the horticultural trade.

References

Orchid nothogenera
Laeliinae
Historically recognized angiosperm taxa